Trampas Canyon is a short tributary of San Juan Creek in southern Orange County the U.S. state of California. 
It rises in forks on steep slopes of the southern Santa Ana Mountains, and flows north to where it is dammed by Trampas Canyon Dam (USGS San Clemente Quad 7½"). Trampas Canyon 1795-006 Dam 
() 
forms a small lake that branches into four forks running east–west. Exiting the dam, the creek flows north and turns slightly to the west, where it joins San Juan Creek on the left bank, near the confluence of Cañada Gobernadora. Trampas Canyon Creek is ephemeral and only flows during storm events or while Trampas Canyon Dam is releasing, and is not a primary tributary of San Juan Creek.

A study was prepared in 1999 by the City of San Juan Capistrano, and it was found that a failure of the earthen Trampas Canyon Dam would do more damage to the lower course of San Juan Creek than for a 100 year flood. A 100-year flood would cause a slightly smaller inundation.

References

External links
Orange County Watersheds: San Juan Creek

Rivers of Orange County, California
San Juan Creek
Rivers of Southern California